Nobody's Buddy is an American children's novel written by John A. Moroso and published in 1936 by Goldsmith Publishing Co. of Chicago, Illinois.

Plot introduction

Sweet story of a homeless boy and his dog, and their adventures with the circus and the local sheriff.

1936 American novels
American children's novels
Children's novels about animals
Circus books
1936 children's books